The Clear Lake splittail (Pogonichthys ciscoides) was endemic to California's Clear Lake and its tributaries until its numbers severely declined due to competition from the introduced bluegill and alterations to the flow of inlet streams. In greatly reduced numbers, the Clear Lake Splittail barely persisted until the 1967 introduction to surrounding lakes of the inland silverside as an experiment by the Department of Fish & Game. A fisherman supposedly introduced the silverside via bait bucket into Clear Lake. This dealt the final blow to the Clear Lake splittail, which had similar feeding habits. All of the splittails were taken by fishermen or have been eaten by catfish and large mouth bass. No Clear Lake splittails have been captured since the early 1970s, and the species is presumed to be extinct.

References

 
 
 

Pogonichthys
Endemic fauna of California
Fish described in 1974
Extinct animals of the United States
Fish of North America becoming extinct since 1500
Natural history of Lake County, California